Falling From Grace is an EP released by former Belle & Sebastian member Isobel Campbell under the name of The Gentle Waves. The album was released In October 2000.

Track listing
"Falling From Grace'"
"Going Home"
"October's Sky"
"Hold Back A Thousand Hours"

References

External links
 Official website Info on the album

2000 EPs
Jeepster Records EPs